is a Japanese football player. He plays for Gainare Tottori.

Club statistics
Updated to 23 February 2017.

References

External links

Profile at Gainare Tottori

1993 births
Living people
Ryutsu Keizai University alumni
Association football people from Hiroshima Prefecture
Japanese footballers
J3 League players
Gainare Tottori players
Association football defenders